Park Seon-mi or Pak Sŏn-mi (박선미) may refer to:

 Park Sun-mi (born 1972), South Korean taekwondo practitioner
 Pak Sun-mi (born 1982), South Korean volleyball player
 Park Seon-mi (born 1982), South Korean field hockey player